I Love You is a 2004 Indian Odia romance action film directed by Hara Patnaik and produced by Sanjay Nayak. It stars debutante Anubhav Mohanty and Mumbai based model and actress Namrata Thapa.

This film is a remake of 1999 Tamil film Thulladha Manamum Thullum which starred Vijay and Simran in the lead roles. The film was re-released in 2012.

Cast 
 Anubhav Mohanty
 Namrata Thapa
 Bijoy Mohanty
 Tandra Ray
 Anita Das
 Hara Patnaik

References

External links
 

2004 films
Odia remakes of Tamil films
2000s Odia-language films
Films directed by Hara Patnaik